Symphony No. 66 may refer to:

Joseph Haydn's Symphony No. 66 in B flat major
Alan Hovhaness's Symphony No. 66, Op. 428, Hymn to Glacier Peak

066